The Los Angeles Warriors are a team of the Women's Football Alliance which began play for the 2010 season.  Based in Los Angeles, California, the Warriors play their home games at Michelle and Barack Obama Sports Complex in Los Angeles, CA. 

The Warriors are the only Los Angeles County-based team in the WFA.

Season-By-Season

|-
| colspan="6" align="center" | California Lynx (WFA)
|-
|2009 || 5 || 3 || 0 || 2nd American Pacific || --
|-
| colspan="6" align="center" | Pacific Warriors (WFA)
|-
|2010 || 7 || 1 || 0 || T-1st American South Pacific || Lost American Conference Quarterfinal (Lone Star)
|-
|2011 || 4 || 4 || 0 || 2nd American South Pacific || --
|-
|2012* || 3 || 1 || 0 || 1st WFA American 17 || --
|-
!Totals || 19 || 10 || 0
|colspan="2"| (including playoffs)

* = current standing

2010

Season schedule

** = Won by forfeit

2011

Standings

Season schedule

2012

Season schedule

External links
Los Angeles Warriors Website

Women's Football Alliance teams
American football teams in Los Angeles
American football teams established in 2009
2009 establishments in California
Women's sports in California